Christa Sauls (born April 15, 1972) is an American model and actress.

Career 
Sauls started her television career in the mid-1990s with roles in Step by Step and Baywatch Nights. In 1997 she appeared in the Conan series and had a lead role in the second season of Acapulco H.E.A.T.. In the late-1990s, she had appearances in L.A. Heat and Silk Stalkings and Beverly Hills, 90210. She has also had roles in several films including The Dentist in 1996.

Filmography

Film

Television

External links

References 

Living people
1972 births
People from Kinston, North Carolina